Wellington (later known as Tye) was a small unincorporated railroad community in the northwest United States, on the Great Northern Railway in northeastern King County, Washington.

Founded in 1893, it was located in the Cascade Range at the west portal of the original Cascade Tunnel under Stevens Pass. It was the site of the 1910 Wellington avalanche, the worst in U.S. history, in which 96 people died.

1910 avalanche

The Wellington avalanche was the deadliest avalanche in the history of the United States, marked by the total death count of 96.

For nine days at the end of February 1910, the Wellington area experienced a severe blizzard. Up to a foot (30 cm) of snow fell every hour, and, on the worst day,  of snow fell. Two trains, a passenger train and a mail train, both bound from Spokane to Seattle, were trapped in the depot. Snow plows were present at Wellington and others were sent to help, but they could not penetrate the snow accumulations and repeated avalanches along the stretch of tracks between Scenic and Leavenworth.

Late on February 28, the snow stopped and was replaced by rain and a warm wind. Just after 1 a.m. on March 1, as a result of a lightning strike, a slab of snow broke loose from the side of Windy Mountain during a thunderstorm. A ten-foot high mass of snow, half a mile long and a quarter of a mile wide, fell toward the town. A forest fire had recently ravaged the slopes above the town, leaving very little to impede the avalanche.

The avalanche missed the Bailets Hotel (which also housed the town's general store and post office), but hit the railroad depot. Most of the passengers and crew were asleep aboard their trains. The impact threw the trains  downhill and into the Tye River valley. Ninety-six people were killed, including 35 passengers, 58 Great Northern employees on the trains, and three railroad employees in the depot. Twenty-three people survived; they were pulled from the wreckage by railroad employees who immediately rushed from the hotel and other buildings where they had been staying. However, the work was then abandoned because of the adverse weather conditions, and it was not until 21 weeks later (late July) that the last of the bodies were retrieved.

This was not the only avalanche in the region that winter. Three days later, 63 railroad workers were killed in the Rogers Pass avalanche nearby in British Columbia.

Aftermath 
Wellington was quietly renamed "Tye" during October because of the unpleasant associations of the old name. In the same month, the Great Northern Railway began construction of concrete snow sheds to shelter the nearby tracks. The depot was closed when the second Cascade Tunnel was completed in 1929; the town was then abandoned and it eventually burned.

The old track and snow sheds remain and have been preserved as part of the Iron Goat Trail, which is accessible easily from U.S. Highway 2 near Stevens Pass or near Scenic, east of Everett.

See also
1910 Rogers Pass avalanche
Frank Slide

References

Martin Burwash,Vis Major Railroad Men, an Act of God--White Death at Wellington iUniverse, 2009
Cascade Division: A Pictorial Essay of the Burlington Northern and Milwaukee Road in the Washington Cascades, Fox Publications, 1995
Lee Davis, Encyclopedia of Natural Disasters, Headline, 1992
Gary Krist, The White Cascade: The Great Northern Railway Disaster and America's Deadliest Avalanche, Holt, 2007
T. Gary Sherman, Conquest and Catastrophe, The Triumph and Tragedy of the Great Northern Railway Through Stevens Pass, AuthorHouse, 2004.

External links
Contemporary photographs
Iron Goat Trail website
The White Cascade (book about the avalanche) website
Wellington Disaster
THE GREAT WELLINGTON TRAIN DISASTER IN THE SKY VALLEY 100 Years Ago (Sky Valley Chronicle)

1893 establishments in Washington (state)
1929 disestablishments in Washington (state)
Ghost towns in King County, Washington
Populated places disestablished in 1929
Populated places established in 1893
Unincorporated communities in King County, Washington
1910
Unincorporated communities in Washington (state)
20th-century avalanches
Natural disaster ghost towns